Caught in the Fog is a 1928 American thriller film directed by Howard Bretherton and written by Charles R. Condon and Joseph Jackson. The film stars May McAvoy, Conrad Nagel and Mack Swain, and features Hugh Herbert, Charles K. Gerrard and Émile Chautard. The film was released by Warner Bros. on August 25, 1928.

Cast
May McAvoy as The Girl
Conrad Nagel as Bob Vickers
Mack Swain as Detective Ryan
Hugh Herbert as Detective Riley
Charles K. Gerrard as Crook
Émile Chautard as The Old Man
Ruth Cherrington as The Old Woman

Box office
According to Warner Bros records the film earned $355,000 domestically and $61,000 internationally.

Preservation
An incomplete 35mm copy of this film survives at the British Film Institute's National Film and Television Archive.

References

External links
 

1928 films
Warner Bros. films
American thriller films
1920s thriller films
Films directed by Howard Bretherton
American black-and-white films
1920s English-language films
1920s American films